United States International University Africa, also known as USIU Africa, is a private university in Kenya, the largest economy in the East African Community. The university is accredited by the Commission for Higher Education (CUE) in Kenya and by the Western Association of Schools and Colleges (WASC) in the United States.

Location
The university campus is located in the Roysambu neighbourhood, in the Kasarani suburb of Nairobi, Kenya's capital and largest city. The coordinates of the university campus are: 01°13'05.0"S, 36°52'45.0"E (Latitude:-1.218056; Longitude:36.879167).

History
The university was established in 1969 as the Nairobi Campus of United States International University (USIU), a San Diego -based institution. In 1999, the United States International University, Nairobi Campus, established itself as a separate university under its new name: USIU Africa. In 2001, USIU merged with the California School of Professional Psychology (CSPP) to form Alliant International University.

Over 130 nationalities are represented among the student population undertaking 24 undergraduate, graduate and doctoral programs at USIU Africa. The university has an alumni population in excess of 140,000.

Academic schools
As of May 2021, USIU Africa maintained the following academic schools:

 The Chandaria School of Business 
 The School of Science and Technology
 The School of Humanities & Social Sciences 
 The School of Pharmacy & Health Sciences.
 The School of Graduate Studies, Research & Extension
 The School of Communication, Cinematic and Creative Arts.

Academic courses
 Undergraduate courses
 BSc International Business Administration
 BSc Accounting
 BSc in Hotel and Restaurant Management
 BSc in Tourism Management
 BSc Finance
 BA in Animation
 BSc in Applied Computer Technology
 BA in Film and Production and Directing
 BSc in Information Systems Technology
 Bachelor of Journalism
 BA International Relations
 BA Criminal Justice Studies
 BA Psychology
 Bachelor of Pharmacy

 Graduate and doctoral courses
 Master of Business Administration
 MSc in Management and Organizational Development
 Doctor of Business Administration
 Master of Science in Information Systems Technology
 Master of Arts in Communication Studies
 MA in International Relations
 MA in Counselling Psychology
 MA in Clinical Psychology
 MA in Marriage and Family Therapy
 Doctor of Psychology
 PhD in International Relations.

Notable alumni

Emmanuel Ikubese
 Catherine Mturi-Wairi: Former Managing Director of Kenya Ports Authority.
 Esther Passaris: Social entrepreneur, philanthropist and politician.
Kris Senanu:  businessman
 Vimal Shah: Chief Executive Officer of Bidco Africa, a multinational consumer products manufacturer and distributor.

See also
 List of universities in Kenya
 Alliant International University
 Education in Kenya

References

External links
Website of USIU Africa
USIU Nairobi To Build KSh735 Million Student Centre
Dr. Paul Tiyambe Zeleza Appointed New USIU Vice Chancellor, Effective 1 January 2016

 
Educational institutions established in 1969
Education in Nairobi
1969 establishments in Kenya
United States International University